In chemistry, antimonite refers to a salt of antimony(III), such as NaSb(OH)4 and NaSbO2 (meta-antimonite), which can be prepared by reacting alkali with antimony trioxide, Sb2O3. These are formally salts of antimonous acid, Sb(OH)3, whose existence in solution is dubious. Attempts to isolate it generally form Sb2O3·xH2O, antimony(III) oxide hydrate, which slowly transforms into Sb2O3.

In geology, the mineral stibnite, Sb2S3, is sometimes called antimonite.

Antimonites can be compared to antimonates, which contain antimony in the +5 oxidation state.

References

Antimony(III) compounds
Oxyanions

th:สติบไนท์